Atriplex argentea is a species of saltbush known by the common names silverscale saltbush and silver orache. It is native to western North America from southern Canada to northern Mexico, where it grows in many types of habitat, generally on saline soils.

Description
Atriplex argentea is an annual herb producing branching stems which spread out low to the ground or reach erect to maximum heights approaching 80 centimeters. The leaves are triangular to roughly oval in shape and 1 to 4 centimeters long. The stems and leaves are coated in gray scales.

The inflorescences are rough clusters of tiny flowers, with male and female flowers in separate clusters.

Uses
Among the Zuni people,  a poultice of chewed root is applied to sores and rashes. An infusion of the root is also taken for stomachache.

References

External links
Calflora Database: Atriplex argentea (silver saltweed, silverscale saltbush)
Jepson Manual treatment for Atriplex argentea
Atriplex argentea — UC Photo gallery

argentea
Halophytes
Flora of Western Canada
Flora of the Western United States
Flora of Northwestern Mexico
Flora of Northeastern Mexico
Flora of the United States
Flora of California
Flora of Nevada
Flora of Washington (state)
Flora of the Sierra Nevada (United States)
Flora of the Rocky Mountains
Flora of the California desert regions
Flora of the Great Basin
Flora of the Sonoran Deserts
Natural history of the Colorado Desert
Natural history of the Mojave Desert
Plants used in traditional Native American medicine
Flora without expected TNC conservation status